Coventry (foaled 1922 in Kentucky) was an American Thoroughbred racehorse best known for winning the 1925 edition of the Preakness Stakes.

Background
Coventry was bred by Edward Simms, the owner of Xalapa Farm in Paris, Kentucky, who had purchased a half interest in his sire Negofol from Louis Jean Decazes.

Consigned to the 1923 yearling auction, Coventry was sold for $25,000 to New York carpet manufacturer Gifford A. Cochran. In 1925, Coventry's training was handled by future U.S. Hall of Fame member Bill Duke, who knew the colt's breeding, having returned from France that year where he had been training Thoroughbreds since 1888. Duke had trained Coventry's sire, Negofol, for Willie Vanderbilt's racing stable and had won important races with him, including the French Derby. Back home in the United States, in 1925 Duke also trained Coventry's stable mate, a colt owned by Gifford Cochran named Flying Ebony whose ability to run extremely well on muddy racetracks resulted in his winning of the May 16 rain-soaked Kentucky Derby.

Racing career
Coventry made just five lifetime starts, winning once. The one win came in the 1925 Preakness Stakes. Ridden by Clarence Kummer, the colt went off at the longest odds of any Preakness winner in history, paying backers $45.60 for a $2 wager. That record stood for exactly fifty years until Master Derby in 1975 paid $48.80. In his next race,  the Withers Stakes at New York's Aqueduct Racetrack, Coventry broke down and was retired to stud.

Stud record
He had very limited success as a sire. Hand To Hand and Durango were his best runners, each winning a number of minor races.

Breeding

References

1922 racehorse births
Racehorses bred in Kentucky
Racehorses trained in the United States
Preakness Stakes winners
Thoroughbred family 12-b